Jonathan Wale (born 1991) is a British and Scottish track cyclist.

Cycling career
Wale represented Scotland at the 2018 Commonwealth Games.

He became British champion when winning the time trial Championship at the 2020 British National Track Championships. He had finished third in 2019. At the 2022 British National Track Championships in Newport, Wales he won the silver medal in the time trial.

References

1991 births
Living people
British male cyclists
British track cyclists
Sportspeople from Edinburgh
Scottish track cyclists
Cyclists at the 2018 Commonwealth Games
Commonwealth Games competitors for Scotland